The Minnesota State Mavericks women's ice hockey program will represent Minnesota State University, Mankato during the 2017-18 NCAA Division I women's ice hockey season.

Recruiting

2017–18 Mavericks

2017-18 Schedule

|-
!colspan=12 style="background:purple;color:gold;"| Regular Season

|-
!colspan=12 style="background:purple;color:gold;"| WCHA Tournament

Awards and honors

References

Minnesota State
Minnesota State Mavericks women's ice hockey seasons
Minnesota State